Postigo is a Spanish surname. Notable people with the surname include:
Juan García Postigo (born 1982), Spanish beauty pageant contestant
Luis García Postigo (born 1969), Mexican football player
Serge Postigo (born 1968), Canadian actor
Sergio Postigo (born 1988), Spanish football player

Spanish-language surnames